Nicklas Kulti and Max Mirnyi were the defending champions but only Mirnyi competed that year with Sandon Stolle.

Mirnyi and Stolle lost in the quarterfinals to Wayne Black and Kevin Ullyett.

Ellis Ferreira and Rick Leach won in the final 3–6, 6–4, 6–3 against Mahesh Bhupathi and Leander Paes.

Seeds
Champion seeds are indicated in bold text while text in italics indicates the round in which those seeds were eliminated. All eight seeded teams received byes to the second round.

Draw

Final

Top half

Bottom half

External links
 2001 Paris Masters Doubles Draw

2001 Paris Masters
Doubles